Salix viminalis, the basket willow, common osier or osier, is a species of willow native to Europe, Western Asia, and the Himalayas.

Description
It has long, erect, straight branches with greenish-grey bark. The leaves long and slender, 10–25 cm long but only 0.5–2 cm broad; they are dark green above, with a silky grey-haired underside. The flowers are catkins, produced in early spring before the leaves; they are dioecious, with male and female catkins on separate plants. The male catkins are yellow and oval-shaped; the female catkins are longer and more cylindrical; they mature in early summer when the fruit capsules split open to release the numerous minute seeds.

Distribution and habitat
It is commonly found by streams and other wet places. The exact native range is uncertain due to extensive historical cultivation; it is certainly native from central Europe east to western Asia, but may also be native as far west as southeastern England. As a cultivated or naturalised plant, it is widespread throughout both Britain and Ireland, but only at lower altitudes. It is one of the least variable willows, but it will hybridise with several other species.

Uses
Along with other related willows, the flexible twigs (called withies) are commonly used in basketry, giving rise to its alternative common name of "basket willow". Cultivation and use of the common osier was common in England in the 18th and 19th century, with osier beds lining many rivers and streams. In the Chilean village of Chimbarongo, it is used to fashion their renowned baskets.

Another increasing use is in energy forestry, effluent treatment, in wastewater gardens, and in cadmium phytoremediation for water purification.

Salix viminalis is a known hyperaccumulator of  cadmium, chromium, lead, mercury, petroleum hydrocarbons, organic solvents, MTBE, TCE and byproducts, selenium, silver, uranium, and zinc, and as such is a prime candidate for phytoremediation. For more information, see the list of hyperaccumulators.

Ecology

Among the most common pathogens on S. viminalis are Melampsora spp. Female plants are more severely infected than male plants.

References

External links

 

viminalis
Flora of Europe
Flora of temperate Asia
Flora of tropical Asia
Phytoremediation plants
Plants described in 1753
Taxa named by Carl Linnaeus